18407/08 Puri–Sainagar Shirdi Weekly Superfast Express is a Express train belonging to Indian Railways East Coast Railway zone that run between  and  in India.

Service 
It operates as train number 20857 from Puri to Sainagar Shirdi and as train number 20858 in the reverse direction, serving the states of Maharashtra, Chhattisgarh & Odisha .

Coaches

The 20857 / 58 Puri–Sainagar Shirdi  Weekly Superfast Express has one AC-1 Tier, one AC 2-tier,  five AC 3-tier, Nine sleeper class, Three general unreserved, One Generator Car, Two SLR (seating with luggage rake) coaches & One pantry car.

As with most train services in India, coach composition may be amended at the discretion of Indian Railways depending on demand.

Routing

Traction
Later a Bhusawal or Itarsi loco shed-based WAP-4 or a Bhilai loco shed-based WAP-7 electric locomotive pulls the train to its destination.

References

External links
18407 Puri–Sainagar Shirdi Express at India Rail Info
18408 Sainagar Shirdi–Puri Express at India Rail Info

Express trains in India
Rail transport in Maharashtra
Rail transport in Chhattisgarh
Rail transport in Odisha
Transport in Puri
Transport in Shirdi